A meme coin (also spelled memecoin) is a cryptocurrency that originated from an Internet meme or has some other humorous characteristic. It may be used in the broadest sense as a critique of the cryptocurrency market in its entirety—those based on particular memes such as "doge coins", celebrities like Coinye, and pump-and-dump schemes such as BitConnect—or it may be used to make cryptocurrency more accessible. The term is often dismissive, comparing the value or performances of those cryptocurrencies to that of mainstream ones. Supporters, on the other hand, observe that some memecoins have acquired social currency and high market capitalizations.

In late 2013, Dogecoin was released after being created as a joke on the Doge meme by software engineers. This sparked the creation of several subsequent meme coins. In October 2021, there were about 124 meme coins circulating in the market. Notable examples include Dogecoin and Shiba Inu.

In late 2021, advertisements promoting the meme coin Floki Inu in London led to subsequent investigations around promoting the meme coin, considered to be an unregulated financial product by the ASA (The Advertising Standards Authority). 

Some countries have taken steps to regulate meme coins. In early 2021, Thailand's Securities and Exchange Commission banned meme coins as part of a crackdown on digital goods with "no clear objective or substance".

Popularity 
Meme coins have surged in popularity since Elon Musk endorsed the use of Dogecoin, one of the first meme coins. He continues to post tweets about Dogecoin in 2022, including one in January where he stated he would eat a Happy Meal from McDonald's on live TV if they started accepting Dogecoin as payment. The risk of losing money is significant. However, some projects seem to be successful and sustainable over time.

References

External links
Will APENFT token listed on Binance
Bigtert Token Prediction
Storepay Token Prediction
Cryptocurrencies
Internet memes